Tractor Cultural Sports Economic Club (Bâšgâh-e Farhangi Varzeši Eqtesâdi-ye Terâktor), commonly known as Tractor, formerly Tractor Sazi, is an Iranian football club based in Tabriz, East Azerbaijan, that competes in the Persian Gulf Pro League. The club was founded in 1970 by the Iran Tractor Manufacturing Company.

Since the beginning of the 1996–97 season, Tractor has played its home games at the Sahand which has a seating capacity of 70,000,https://www.varzesh3.com/news/1367098 though it is able to hold more people during important matches. Tractor holds the attendance record for a promoted team in Iranian football when they had an estimated average attendance about 57,000 during the 2009–10 season. The club is owned and supported by the businessman Mohammad Reza Zonuzi since 2018.

Tractor is one of the most successful clubs in Tabriz, having won two Hazfi Cups and one Azadegan League title. The club's colors are red.

History

Pre-Revolution
Tractor FC was formed in 1969 in support of the Tractor Manufacturing Company in Tabriz. They played in the Pasargad League for five years until 1975. They finished 1975–76 as the winner of the Pasargard League and were promoted to the Takht Jamshid Cup (now the Iran Pro League). In their first season in the Takht Jamshid Cup, they were in poor form, and as a result they were relegated to the Pasargard League after just one year in the first division. They also lost the Hazfi Cup final to Malavan in the cup's inaugural edition. After their relegation, Hossein Fekri remained as the club's manager and led them to a return to the first division for the 1977–78 season, which they finished in 5th place. In the 1978–79 season, which never finished due to the Iranian Revolution, they were in 8th place with twelve matches played. Their rival at the time was Machine Sazi, who are also based in Tabriz.

Post-Revolution
In the 1980s the national league was suspended due to the Iran–Iraq War, therefore Tractor were forced to compete in the Tabriz Local Leagues for many years. In the 1986–87 Qods League the East Azerbaijan Provincial team, with a mix of players from Tractor and rivals Machine Sazi, made it to the final, but were defeated in the final by the Isfahan Provincial team.

1990s
Romanian coach Vasile Godja was in charge of Tractor's youth teams from 1986. He was also a worker at the Tractor Company and discovered various talents as the B team's coach. He also discovered and trained various talented players like Karim Bargheri, Sirous Dinmohammadi, Alireza Nikmer and Hossein Khatibi which, in time, played for Iran's national team. In 1990, he was promoted to first team coach and led the club in the 1992–93 season, finishing third place in the national competition. Esmail Halali was their star in this period. Under his leadership in 1994, Tractor made the finals of the Hazfi Cup again, this time losing to Bahman in the final, and won the MILLS International cup in India in 1995.

Godja left the team in 1997 after eight years in charge of the club. Mohammad Hossein Ziaei then became the player-coach of Tractor. At this time, notable players of the team started their migration to the other clubs. 1998 to 2001 they finished the league in mid-table.

Iran Pro League
In 2001, IRIFF formed the Iran Pro League as the professional league. The inaugural 2001–02 season under Reza Vatankhah and Mahmoud Yavari's management, saw Tractor relegated to the Azadegan League after the club finished bottom of the league.

Relegation to Azadegan League
Tractor spent seven seasons in the Azadegan League (Iran's second division) and were unable to climb to the Iran Pro League. Tractor qualified for the promotion play-off in the 2006–07 season but lost to Shirin Faraz 4–2. After the appointment of Faraz Kamalvand as the manager before the 2008–09 season, Tractor were promoted to the Iran Pro League for the first time in 8 years.

Return to Pro League

In the 2011–12 season and under Amir Ghalenoei's management, Tractor finished as runners-up, securing a spot for the 2013 AFC Champions League. This was the first time Tractor had qualified for the competition, subsequently qualifying for the 2014 and 2015 editions as well. In July 2012, former S.L. Benfica and Sevilla FC coach, Toni was named as the club's manager. He led the club to a runners up finish in the Iran Pro League.

Champions League

After a fall out between Oliveira and the club chairman, Oliveira was sacked and Majid Jalali was brought in for the 2013–14 season. After a poor run of results Jalali was fired and Toni returned, almost immediately leading Tractor to a Hazfi Cup Championship, and a place in the 2015 AFC Champions League. They also finished the season in the 6th place, after they defeated Esteghlal 3–1 in the last match at Azadi Stadium. Tractor were also unable to qualify for the knock-out stage of the AFC Champions League for the second consecutive year, after they finished 4th in their group in both the 2013 and 2014 editions. In 2015, Tractor again were eliminated in the group stage of the AFC Champions League for the third straight time.

On 15 May 2015, the final match of the season was played between Tractor and Naft Tehran. The match took place at Sahand Stadium in Tabriz. After communication issues at the stadium, Tractor staff mistakenly thought that Sepahan was losing to Saipa, which would mean Tractor would win the league with a draw. Tractor tied the game, believing that a 3–3 draw with Naft had won them the title. While they were celebrating with their fans on the field, they found out that the actual result of the parallel game was 2–0 for Sepahan and that Sepahan were league champions. Tractor finished as runners-up for the third time, with Amir Ghalenoi in 2011–12 and Toni in 2012–13 and 2014–15.

Midway through the 2015–16 season Tractor head coach Toni was once again sacked and replaced by Amir Ghalenoi. On 24 February 2016 Tractor won their first match of the 2016 AFC Champions League in a 4–0 win against Emirati club Al Jazira. Tractor won the return leg 1–0 on 2 March 2016 in Abu Dhabi as well. After the first two games, Tractor surpassed the most points they ever gained in the AFC Champions League group stage. Tractor qualified for the knock-out stages of the Champions League for the first time in their history on 19 April 2016 after defeating Saudi club Al-Hilal 2–0. Tractor eventually lost in the Round of 16 to Emirati club Al Nasr.

In the 2016–17 season, Tractor defeated Zob Ahan in the semi final of the Hazfi Cup to reach the final against Naft Tehran. In January 2017 it was revealed that Tractor had been suspended from two transfer windows by FIFA due to outstanding debts to former players. This led to the club terminating the contract of Sajjad Shahbazzadeh whom they had signed days earlier.

Fans

Official anthem
There are a lot of popular marches for Tractor S.C. but 'Tiraxtur iftixarımız' ('Tractor is our pride'), created and implemented in 2012, was chosen as the official anthem. The table below shows the lyrics of the Tractor fans anthem:.
 Songwriter: Ayyub Shahbazi
 Composer: Gholam Reza Mirzazadeh
 Arrangement: Mohammad Hossein Drablou
 Singer: Esfandiar Garabaghi

Violence and racist slogans 

In home games, Tractor fans often shout racial insults and calls to violence against the other ethnic groups in Iran, in particular Persians and Kurds. Some supporters also carry the flag of the Republic of Azerbaijan inside the stadium. In a match on November 1, 2019, in response to Turkey's recent military operation against the Syrian Kurds, the ethnic Azerbaijani Tractor fans chanted "Death to Kurds!" throughout the match and carried banners stating "Either Czechoslovakia or Yugoslavia!", in reference to the Yugoslav Wars.

A percentage of fans do not care much about the football game and its results and are looking for a safe gathering place to express political separatist tendencies, as some Tractor fans compare their club and Pan-Turkism with FC Barcelona and Catalanism ideology. These movements mainly include chanting slogans and carrying ethnic writings, and sometimes they have themes in support of Turkey and the Republic of Azerbaijan political acts.

During the transfer of the 16th Persian Gulf Pro League, the CEO of Tractor club, Mostafa Ajorlu announced a two-year contract with Varazdat Haroyan, the central defender of the Armenian national team. But after 12 hours of this incident, the CEO of Tractor Club published an article on his Instagram and announced that they gave up recruiting Haroyan. Ajorlu stated that the reason for this action was the unity of the Turks and in response to the protest of some of the team's fans, the fans' protest was due to the so-called «occupation of Karabagh» by Armenians, and they consider Israel and Armenia to be the occupiers. This action was criticized by the media due to suspicions about racism and the involvement of politics in sports. Also, on the 10th of March 2017, during the match between Tractor and Sepahan teams that was held at Yadgar-e Imam Stadium in Tabriz, some Tractor fans set on fire the Armenian flag inside the stadium in protest of the incidents that occurred during the visit of the Prime Minister of Armenia to Tehran.

Damage to opponent's stadiums 
In some away games, Tractor fans burned the stadium seats and damaged the walls of the stadium. In 2018, they inflicted heavy damage on the Azadi stadium. In 2017, They did damage to Yadegar-e Emam Stadium of Qom.

Crest
From its foundation, the team used a red crest. On the exterior circle, the name of the club and the date of its foundation were written. The second crest was white until 2013, when the club changed the colour of the crest to black.

Kit
They were previously sponsored by the Hamrah-e Aval (Mobile Telecommunication Company). In July 2018, the club signed a contract with Merooj, starting from 2017–18 Iran Pro League season.

Media
The official matches of the club in Iran Pro League, Hazfi Cup and AFC Champions League are broadcast from Sahand TV (The club's city owned TV station), Varzesh and Shoma channels. Online viewing is also available on the official site of the club and three above TV channels sites. Important matches are also broadcast from IRIB TV3, Jame Jam and SAHAR TV.

Ownership
The club is owned by the Tractor Manufacturing Company since its establishment in 1970. Since 2011, it has been owned by Kowsar Foundation (51%), with 30% of the club belonging to the East-Azerbaijan Province. In addition, the Iranian Mehr Institute is an affiliate of Kowsar Foundation and other stakeholders and custodians of the club. Kowsar Foundation is part of Sepah Pasdaran – with the club enabling its players to complete their military service. Since 2018, the club has been owned by Mohammad Reza Zonouzi, an Iranian businessman and shareholder.

Rivals
Tractor has most rivalry with two big Iranian football clubs, Esteghlal and Persepolis.

Persepolis–Tractor rivalry 

Persepolis–Tractor rivalry started in 2009 when Tractor returned to first tier of Iranian football league after 8 years and their fans had passion about this event. Mustafa Denizli is one of the club's most popular coaches in this rivalry. In 2019, Tractor defeated Persepolis after more than five years when Denizli was the head coach.

Esteghlal–Tractor rivalry 
This rivalry started in 2009 and in the past years this rivalry was a bit overwhelmed by violence from both fans. On 10 May 2015, Tractor defeated Esteghlal with 4 goals. On 1 November 2019, they were beaten 4–2 by Esteghlal in Yadegar-e Emam Stadium.

Machine Sazi–Tractor rivalry 
Tractor has brotherly relationship with Machine Sazi (another football club from Tabriz). During the 1970s both Tractor and Machine Sazi met regularly in the Takht Jamshid Cup and both teams had some memorable successes in the fixture. Following the creation of the Azadegan League, Machine Sazi and Tractor met twice in the 1996–97 Azadegan League.

Machine Sazi's promotion to the Iran Pro League in 2016 saw fans eagerly anticipating the first league derbies in 7 years.

Affiliated clubs

 Rubin Kazan

Players

Current squad

For recent transfers, see List of Iranian football transfers summer 2022.

Stadium

Tractor played their home matches from 1979 until 1996 in the 20,000 capacity Bagh Shomal Stadium (Takhti Stadium), 1976 AFC Asian Cup stadium. Sahand Stadium (Yadegar-e Emam Stadium) was replaced with Bagh-e Shomal Stadium after it was completed in January 1996. The stadium is the second biggest stadium in Iran with 70,000 seats. The stadium is also part of Tabriz Olympic Complex.

During Sahand Stadium's renovation in 2005 until 2006 years, Bakeri Stadium was the club's home ground in the Azadegan League matches. The stadium has 10,000 capacity.

Recent seasons
The results of the club in last 13 years.
{|class="wikitable"  style="text-align: left;"
|-
!Season!!Position!!MP!!W!!D!!L!!GF!!GA!!GD!!Pts!!Hazfi Cup!!ACL!!colspan=2|Top Scorers (Goals)!!colspan=3|Manager(s)
|-
|2021–22 PGP
|13th||30||7||10||14||26||32||-6||31
| 1/16 Final
| –
|  M. Abbaszadeh(8)
|  P. Babaei(5)
|  F. Karimi
|  Z. Soldo
|  E. Sağlam
|-
|2020–21 PGP
|4th||30||12||9||9||35||29||+6||45
| 1/8 Final
| 1/8 Final
|  M. Abbaszadeh(12)
|  P. Babaei(8)
|  A. Mansourian
|  M. Shojaei
|  R. Khatibi
|-
|2019–20 PGP
|4th||30||14||8||8||31||21||+8||50
| style="background:Gold;"|Champions
| –
|  E. Hajsafi(6)
|  R. Asadi(5)
|  M. Denizli
|  S. Elhami
| –
|-
|2018–19 PGP
|5th||30||14||10||6||42||25||+17||52
|1/16 Final
| –
|  A. Stokes(11)
|  A. Dejagah(6)
|  J. Toshack
|  M. Taghavi
|  G. Leekens
|-
|2017–18 PGP
|10th||30||8||10||12||28||33||−5||34
|1/4 Finals
|GS
|  E. Pahlevan(6)
|  M. Iranpourian(6)
|  Y. Golmohammadi
|  E. Sağlam
| –
|-
|2016–17 PGP
|3rd||30||15||11||4||38||24||+14||56
| style="background:Silver;"|Runners-up
| –
|  F. Hatami(7)
|  Edinho(7)
|  A. Ghalenoei
| –
| –
|-
|2015–16 PGP
|4th||30||13||12||5||43||27||+16||51
| Semi Final
|1/8 Final
|  A. Nong(7)
|  M. Iranpourian(7)
|  Toni
| A. Ghalenoei
| –
|-
|2014–15 PGP
|style="background:silver;"|Runners-up||30||17||7||6||58||34||+24||58
| 1/16 Final
|GS
|  Edinho(20)
|  S. Nariman Jahan(9)
| R. Khatibi
|  Toni
| –
|-
|2013–14 PGP
|6th||30||11||13||6||39||33||+6||45
| style="background:Gold;"|Champions
|GS
|  K. Ansarifard(14)
|  S. Daghighi(5)
| M. Jalali
| Toni
| –
|-
|2012–13 PGP
|style="background:silver;"|Runners-up||34||18||11||5||55||32||+23||65
| 1/8 Final
|GS
|  M. Salehi(16)
|  Flavio Paixao(10)
| Toni
| –
| –
|-
|2011–12 PGP
|style="background:silver;"|Runners-up||34||19||9||6||57||32||+25||66
| 1/16 Final
| –
|  Flavio Paixao(10)
|  Tosi(8)
| A. Ghalenoei
| –
| –
|-
|2010–11 PGP
|5th||34||15||12||7||42||29||+13||57
| 1/8 Final
| –
|  A. Alizadeh(8)
| Karrar(8)
| F. Kamalvand
| –
| –
|-
|2009–10 PGP
|7th||34||11||14||9||43||42||+1||47
| 1/8 Final
| –
|  M. Ebrahimi(10)
| F. Kheirkhah(10)
| F. Kamalvand
| –
| –
|-	
|}

Seasons
The table below chronicles the achievements of Tractor in various competitions.

Honours

Official titles
 Iran Pro League
 Runner up (3): 2011–12, 2012–13, 2014–15
 Third Place (2): 2016–17, 1992–93

 Hazfi Cup
 Winner (2): 2013–14, 2019–20
 Runner up (3): 1975–76, 1994–95, 2016–17

 Iranian Super Cup
 Runner up (1): 2020

 Azadegan League (2nd Tier)
 Winner (1): 2008–09

 2nd Division
 Winner (1): 1974–75
 Runner up (2): 1976–77, 1995–96

 East Azerbaijan Super Cup
 Winner (1): 1992

 Tabriz Football League
 Winner (1): 1984–85

 Tabriz Football League's 2nd Division
 Winner (1): 1981–82

Unofficial titles
  DCM Trophy
 Winner (1): 1995–96
  Sardaran Shahid International Cup
 Winner (2): 1995, 1996
  Shohada Cup
 Winner (2): 2014, 2017

Personnel

Current coaching staff

Management

Sports statistics
 Updated to May 2017.

General information

Asian record

Asian Club Championship / AFC Champions League

Accurate as of 21 January 2019

Legend: GF = Goals For. GA = Goals Against. GD = Goal Difference.

Top goalscores in ACL

Individual records
Lists of the players with the most caps and top goalscorers for the club, as of 3 June 2019.Mohammad Ebrahimi is the club's all-time most capped player and top scorer with 31 goals in 180 games. This list includes goals from all competitive matches.

References

 
Football clubs in Iran
Association football clubs established in 1970
Sport in Tabriz
Works association football teams